Leszek Wodzyński (16 February 1946 near Warsaw – 18 September 1999 in Warsaw) was a Polish hurdler and the older brother of Mirosław Wodzyński.  In 1974, the two brothers were ranked #3 and #4 in the world, behind Charles Foster and the eventual 1976 Olympic champion Guy Drut.  Leszek was also in the top 10 in 1972.

Biography
His personal best was 13.64 seconds, achieved in July 1974 in Warsaw. He was participant in Olympic Games 1972.

International competitions

References

World all-time list 110 m hurdles
Die Leichtathletik-Statistikseite
GBR Athletics
Full Olympians
Sporting Heroes

1946 births
1999 deaths
Burials at Powązki Military Cemetery
Polish male hurdlers
Athletes (track and field) at the 1972 Summer Olympics
Olympic athletes of Poland
Athletes from Warsaw
European Athletics Championships medalists
Legia Warsaw athletes
20th-century Polish people